El Cochecito is a 1960 Spanish black comedy film directed by Marco Ferreri. The film is based on Rafael Azcona's novel and Azcona co-wrote the script with Ferreri. The film was a huge flop when it was released in Spain, but nowadays is a cult classic. The film had troubles with Spanish censorship, that forced to change and cut the original ending.

External links
 
Review from June 29, 1987 at The New York Times

1960 films
Spanish black comedy films
Spanish crime comedy-drama films
1960s Spanish-language films
Spanish black-and-white films
Spain in fiction
Madrid in fiction
Films directed by Marco Ferreri
1960s black comedy films
Films based on Spanish novels
Films with screenplays by Rafael Azcona
1960 comedy films
1960 drama films
1960s crime comedy-drama films
1960s Spanish films